Caravaggio is an Italian restaurant located at 23 East 74th Street (between 5th Avenue and Madison Avenue) on the Upper East Side in Manhattan, in New York City.  It is around the corner from the Met Breuer.

History
The restaurant opened July 15, 2009.  It is owned by brothers Giuseppe, Antonio, Cosimo, and Geraldo Bruno.

Menu
Its co-executive chefs are Isauro “Luis” Rosas and Massimo Bebber. Among its dishes are meatballs, eggplant parmigiana, roasted red snapper, roasted swordfish, dover sole, veal chops, ossobuco with saffron risotto, bomboloni, and cannoli.

Decor
The restaurant exhibits two paintings and a sculpture by pop artist Donald Baechler. It also exhibits art by Frank Stella and Ellsworth Kelly, and four original Henri Matisse stencil lithographs.  It has silk-lined walls, and leather seating.

Reviews
In 2013, a review in The New York Times described it as "one of the most civilized Italian restaurants to turn up anywhere in the city in the last few years," but also stated, "...for all its civility, [Caravaggio] is haunted by inconsistency more than three years into its run. Some of my meals there were very good; in others, I couldn’t find a single dish to get excited about, and there were a few that were just not right at all." Overall, their score was 1 star out of a possible 4.

See also
 List of Italian restaurants

References

Further reading
 
Crain's review
New York review
Time Out review

External links

Restaurants in Manhattan
Restaurants established in 2009
Upper East Side
Italian-American culture in New York City
Italian restaurants in New York City
2009 establishments in New York City